Triphenylbromoethylene (TPBE; brand names Bromylene, Eitriphin, Oestronyl, Prostilban, Tribenorm), also known as bromotriphenylethylene or as phenylstilbene bromide, is a synthetic nonsteroidal estrogen of the triphenylethylene group that was marketed in the 1940s similarly to the closely related estrogen triphenylchloroethylene.

A diethoxylated derivative of triphenylbromoethylene, estrobin (DBE), is also an estrogen, but, in contrast, was never marketed. An ethylated derivative of triphenylbromoethylene, broparestrol (BDPE), is a selective estrogen receptor modulator (SERM) that has been marketed.

See also 
 Chlorotrianisene
 M2613
 Triphenyliodoethylene

References 

Abandoned drugs
Organobromides
Synthetic estrogens
Triphenylethylenes